Spalding is an American sports equipment manufacturing company founded by Albert Spalding in Chicago, in 1876, although it is now headquartered in Bowling Green, Kentucky. Spalding currently primarily focuses on basketball, mainly producing balls but also commercializing hoops, rims, nets and ball pump needles. Softballs are commercialized through its subsidiary Dudley Sports.

In the past, Spalding has manufactured balls for other sports, such as American football, baseball, soccer, volleyball, tennis and golf.

For a brief period in the 1980s, Spalding was also a designer of aftermarket automotive wheels.

History

The company was founded in 1876 when Albert Spalding was a pitcher and manager of a baseball team in Chicago, the Chicago White Stockings. The company standardized early baseballs and developed the modern baseball bat with the bulge at its apex. In 1892, Spalding acquired Wright & Ditson and A. J. Reach, both rival sporting goods companies.

In 1893, A.G. Spalding & Brothers purchased the Lamb Knitting Machine Company located in Chicopee Falls, Massachusetts and renamed it the Lamb Manufacturing Company. It used this purchase to consolidate its skate manufactory from Newark and its gymnasium goods manufactory from Philadelphia to the Chicopee plant. Lamb, primarily engaged in manufacturing knitting machines, rifles, and egg-beaters, had been fulfilling a contract since 1890 to produce the Credenda bicycle wheel for Spalding. Spalding chose Chicopee because it was the home of the Overman Wheel Company since he acted as their distributor in the Western USA, and Overman contracted with Lamb to make wheels for its lower-end products.

The Spalding "League Ball" was adopted by the National League and used by the league since 1880 as well as the American Association of Professional Base Ball Clubs for the seasons of 1892–1896. It was manufactured by A. G. Spalding & Bros., Chicago, New York & Philadelphia and sold for $1.50 in 1896.

Production of bicycles continued at the Chicopee plant through the latter part of the 19th century, but in 1899 A.G. Ben Spalding sold its bicycle division to a massive trust called the American Bicycle Company which controlled 65% of the bicycle business in the US.

By 1900, Spalding was selling dumb bells, Indian clubs, and punch bags (boxing).  During 1916, Spalding was selling a wide variety of sports-related items, such as clothing (athletic shirts, belts, pads, sports hats, sports jackets, sports jerseys, sports pants, sports shoes, and swimming suits), bar bells, fencing blades and foils, golf clubs, guy robes, measuring tapes, pulleys and weights, rowing machines, track equipment (discus, hurdles, hammers, javelins, poles for vaulting, shot puts, and stop watches), and whistles.

During World War II, the company joined five other firms to form the New England Small Arms Corporation for manufacture of M1918 Browning Automatic Rifles. A.G. Spalding, as a subcontractor to Sprague Electric Co., also produced parts for the "toothpick" capacitors that were used with the VT proximity fuse.

From the early 1930s through the mid-1940s, Spalding produced the official game pucks for the National Hockey League.  Spalding produced the well-known "Spaldeen" high-bounce rubber ball, said to be a re-use of defective tennis ball cores, that was sold to city children from 1949. In baseball, Spalding manufactured the official ball of the major leagues through the 1976 season, using the Reach brand on American League balls and the Spalding trademark on National League balls. Since 1977 the official ball has been made by Rawlings.

From 1981, in a partnership with the Toyo Rubber Company of Japan, Spalding designed a series of aftermarket automotive wheels known as the "Message" series. It was one of these wheels, the Message II, purportedly described by the company as like a "steam locomotive piston" which won awards from publications such as Motorfan Magazine as the best spoke type wheel and reader's overall choice. Wheels bearing the Spalding name are known to have been manufactured through to at least 1986.

Spalding became a division of the Russell Corporation in 2003.  However, that deal did not encompass Spalding's golf operations, which included the Top-Flite, Ben Hogan and Strata brands, which were eventually bought by Callaway later the same year.

Products 

Spalding developed its first basketball in 1894 based on the design of a baseball, and is currently a leading producer. Spalding was the official ball supplier to the National Basketball Association (NBA) from 1983 to 2021, when the league reunited with Wilson after 37 years away by signing a new contract with that company.

Prior to the merger, Spalding produced the American Football League's ball, the J5V (or J5-V), which was  narrower and  longer than the NFL football, "The Duke" by Wilson.

The company provided the official ball of the Arena Football League, an indoor American football league until its 2019 shutdown; the Horween Leather Company supplied leather to Spalding those balls.

The company was one of the first to use high-profile athletes to endorse its products when tennis player Pancho Gonzales was signed to an exclusive endorsement contract in 1951.

In 2006, Spalding and the NBA announced that they would create a new NBA Official Game Ball for the 2006-07 NBA season, with interlocking segments and made with a synthetic material instead of leather. However, many NBA players complained that the new composite ball became extremely slick after use, wouldn't bounce as high and bounced awkwardly off the rim and backboard and cut their fingers. As a result, the NBA reverted to the old leather balls (with the old eight-panel pattern) on January 1, 2007.

Spalding Athletic Library

The Spalding Athletic Library sold sports and exercise books through the  American Sports Publishing Company from 1892 to 1941.  Both companies were owned and founded by Spalding.  Spalding created the Spalding Athletic Library in 1892.  Spalding also founded the American Sports Publishing Company, and it was incorporated in New Jersey in 1892.  American Sports Publishing Company used a New York address from 1892 to 1941.

The first book published was Life and Battles of James J. Corbett, Volume 1, Number 1 in 1892. The book includes stories of Corbett's past opponents. The first book was published under: Spalding's Athletic Library, American Sports Publishing Company, New York.  The editor of the first book was Richard K. Fox, and Corbett was referred to as the California Wonder.

In the baseball series, Ty Cobb wrote "Strategy in the Outfield."  In the self defense series, Jiu Jitsui with poses by A Minami and K Koyama.

The Spalding Athletic Library covered a variety of sports, exercises, and organizations.  The Brooklyn Daily Eagle newspaper stated regarding this collection, "devoted to all athletics pastimes, indoor and outdoor, and is the recognized American cyclopedia of sport".  An article by the Society for American Baseball Research (SABR) states, "It lasted for many years and enjoyed the greatest success of any publication of its kind."

Advertisements inside books available from Spalding included archery, athletics (track and field; all around; cross country running; and marathon), badminton, baseball, basketball, bicycling, bowling, boxing, canoeing, cricket, croquet, curling, fencing, (American) football, golf, gymnast, handball, hockey, jujutsu, lacrosse, lawn sports, polo, pushball, quoits, racquetball, rowing, rugby, skating, soccer, squash, swimming, tennis, tumbling, volleyball, and wrestling. Bodybuilding books included the dumbbell, Indian club, medicine ball, and pulley weights. Sporting books for organizations included Amateur Athletic Union (AAU), IC4A, National Collegiate Athletic Association (NCAA), Olympics, public schools, and the YMCA. and 

Spalding produced a mail-order catalog that provided a description, price, and picture of their sports equipment, sports books, and exercise books. A couple of examples are How to Play Golf for 25 cents, How to Play Basketball at 10 cents, and How to Train for Bicycling at 10 cents.

Spalding Co purchased Wright & Ditson Co. in 1892 and A.J. Reach Co. in 1889.  For several years after the purchases, Wright & Ditson and A.J. Reach continued to publish sports books separately from the Spalding Athletic Library name.  Professional baseball player George Wright co-founded Wright & Ditson Co.; and professional baseball player Al Reach founded A.J. Reach Co.  The Spalding Baseball Guides were published under A.G. Spalding & Bros. until 1893-1894, and starting in 1894-1895 by American Sports Publishing Company (but not using the Spalding Athletic Library name).

Sponsorships
Spalding is the official ball provider of the following leagues and associations, as well as it has deals with exclusive agreements with some prominent athletes:

American football
  China Arena Football League (CAFL)

Basketball

Leagues & Associations

  Canadian Elite Basketball League (CEBL)
  Liga Nacional de Basketball (LNB)
  EuroLeague
  EuroCup
  Ligue Nationale de Basket (LNB)
  Basketball Bundesliga (BBL)
  Greek Basket League (GBL) 
  Kosovo Basketball Superleague
  Mongolian National Association (MNBA)
  ABA
  NAIA
  NJCAA
  KHSAA
  USCAA
  National Basketball League (NBL) 
  Vietnam Basketball Association (VBA)

National teams

Club teams

 KK Sutjeska Nikšić

Boules
  Federazione Italiana Bocce

Other teams
  Harlem Globetrotters (until they Split to Baden)

Volleyball
  Cuneo Volley
  Wealth Planet Perugia Volley
  Sandbox Volleyball

Testimonials
  Karch Kiraly

See also
 Robert Hathaway, chief of the firm's London branch who became ruler of Sark

References

External links

 
 Papers of Edwin L. Parker, former president of A.G. Spalding & Co., Dwight D. Eisenhower Presidential Library

Sportswear brands
Berkshire Hathaway
Sporting goods manufacturers of the United States
Manufacturing companies established in 1876
Companies based in Alexander City, Alabama
History of Chicago
1876 establishments in Illinois
Sporting goods brands
American companies established in 1876